{{DISPLAYTITLE:C14H10O3}} 
The molecular formula C14H10O3 (molar mass: 226.23 g/mol, exact mass: 226.0630 u) may refer to:

 Benzoic anhydride
 Dithranol, or anthralin